Soothrakkaran is a 2019 Indian Malayalam-language action drama film written and directed by Anil Rraj and produced by Tomy Varghese and Wichu Balamurali. Co-written by Wichu Balamurali, the film stars Gokul Suresh, Niranj Maniyanpilla Raju and Varsha Bollamma in lead roles. The music of the film is composed by Wichu Balamurali and the cinematography is handled by Anil Nair. Original background score by 'Saji Ram'. Jacob Gregory, Lalu Alex and Kailash also appear in important roles. The story revolves around a series of murders that happen in a town, and how the family members of Sreedharan (Lalu Alex), Prabhakaran (Vijayaraghavan) and Balachandran (Santhosh Keezhattoor) are entangled in the same. The film was released in India on 8 March 2019.

Cast 

 Gokul Suresh as Madathil Aravindan
 Niranj Maniyanpilla Raju as Sreejith Prabhakaran / Sreekuttan 
 Varsha Bollamma as Aswathy Balachandran
 Meera Nair as Clara
 Jacob Gregory as Shibu Mon
 Lalu Alex as Madathil Sreedharan
 Vijayaraghavan as Panambil Prabhakaran
 Kailash as Krishnakumar, Prabhakaran's elder son
 Anjana Haridas as Lakshmi Krishnakumar
 Siddique as Minister for Water Resources (Cameo appearance)
 Padmaraj Ratheesh as CI Harish Kurup / Phantom Kurup
 Parvathi T. as Jancy Prabhakaran
 Shammi Thilakan as 'Peppatti' Rajan
 Santhosh Keezhattoor as Balachandran
 Sarayu Mohan
 Swasika as CI Laura
 S. P. Sreekumar as Film director

Soundtrack 
The film features songs composed by debutant Wichu Balamurali and original background score by Saji Ram.

Release 
The film was released on 8 March 2019

Reception
The movie was rated 2.5/5 by Deepika Jayaram of The Times of India and concluded that though there are few intriguing incidents in the film that also throw light on a pertinent social issue, the film fails to make an impact as a thriller.

References

External links
 

2019 films
2019 thriller films
2010s Malayalam-language films
Indian thriller films